Ginns is a surname. Notable people with the surname include:

 Russell Ginns (born 20th century), American game designer
 Sallie Topkis Ginns (1880–1976), American suffragist

See also
 Ginn (disambiguation)